John Francis Darcy (23 June 1898 – 28 January 1972) was an Irish hurler who played as a centre-forward for the Tipperary senior team.

Darcy made his first appearance for the team during the 1922 championship and was a regular member of the starting fifteen until his retirement after the 1926 championship. During that time he won one All-Ireland medal and three Munster medals.

At club level Darcy played with Nenagh Éire Óg.

His brother Mick was also an All-Ireland winner with Tipperary.

References

1898 births
1972 deaths
Nenagh Éire Óg hurlers
Tipperary inter-county hurlers
All-Ireland Senior Hurling Championship winners